Yakov Borisovich Belopolski was a Soviet architect.

Among other work, he was responsible for the design of the Soviet War Memorial in Treptower Park in Berlin. He was awarded the Stalin Prize in 1950, and was granted the title of People's Architect of the USSR in 1988.

Literature 
 Berkovich, Gary. Reclaiming a History. Jewish Architects in Imperial Russia and the USSR. Volume 4. Modernized Socialist Realism: 1955–1991. Weimar und Rostock: Grunberg Verlag. 2022 .

References 

Soviet architects
20th-century architects
1916 births
1993 deaths
Soviet Jews